Reputation laundering occurs when a person or an organization conceals unethical, corrupt, or criminal behavior by performing highly-visible positive actions with the intent to improve their reputation and obscure their history.

Reputation laundering can include gestures such as donating to charities, sponsoring sports teams, or joining prominent associations.

Origin of the term 
One of the first uses of the phrase "reputation laundering" was in 1996, in the book The United Nations and Transnational Organized Crime, which defined it as "the process of acquiring respectability in a new environment".

An early use of the phrase in mass media was in 2010, in a Guardian article headlined "PR firms make London world capital of reputation laundering", a report which focused on the use of public relations (PR) firms by heads of state (including Saudi Arabia, Rwanda, Kazakhstan, and Sri Lanka) to obscure human rights abuses and corruption.

The phrase was in common use by 2016 when it was used by Transparency International in their report "Paradise Lost: Ending the UK’s role as a safe haven for corrupt individuals, their allies and assets". In that report, they defined reputation laundering as "the process of concealing the corrupt actions, past or present, of an individual, government or corporate entity, and presenting their character and behaviour in a positive light."

The phrase "reputation laundering" is a play on the older phrase "money laundering".

Activities associated with reputation laundering 
According to Transparency International, reputation laundering may include activities such as:
 Using public relations companies 
 Developing political connections to influence governments
 Hiring law firms to combat allegations related to past unethical conduct
 Donating to cultural, charitable, and educational organizations
 Sending children to elite schools
 Investing in prestigious sports teams
 Sponsoring major sporting or entertainment events
 Buying highly-visible luxury real estate
 Hiring consultants to enhance their image

Public relation firms 
Reputation laundering activities are sometimes delegated to professional public relations (PR) firms. Techniques employed by PR firms on behalf of the purportedly corrupt or criminal customers include fake social media accounts, blogs by fake personalities, or partisan op-eds.

The British public relations firm Bell Pottinger is noted for using PR techniques for reputation laundering, supporting clients such as Alexander Lukashenko, Bahrain, and the Pinochet Foundation.

Sports 

Involvement in professional sports, by sponsorship or ownership,  is a prominent activity used for reputation laundering.  Examples include the creation of Formula 1 car races in Qatar and Saudi Arabia, ownership of Chelsea F.C. by Roman Abramovich, and ownership of the Newcastle United football club by Saudi Arabian investors.

Charity 
Reputation laundering often involves charitable donations from the persons attempting to improve their reputation. One study found that Russian oligarchs had donated between $372 million and $435 million to charitable institutions in the United States.   Charities and non-profits that received funds, according to a database compiled by David Szakonyi and Casey Michel include MIT, Brandeis University, Mayo Clinic, John F. Kennedy Center for the Performing Arts, New York University, Brookings Institution, Harvard University, and the  New York Museum of Modern Art.

The Sackler family is particularly notable for its charitable donations that aim to repair their reputation, which was heavily damaged by their role in the opioid crisis.  Since 2009, the family has donated over £170m to art institutions in the United Kingdom. 
The family's philanthropy has been characterized as "reputation laundering" from profits acquired from the selling of opiates.  The Sackler family name, as used in institutions which the family have donated to, saw increased scrutiny in the late 2010s over the family's association with OxyContin. David Crow, writing in the Financial Times, described the family name as "tainted" (cf. Tainted donors). In March 2019, the National Portrait Gallery and the Tate galleries announced that they would not accept further donations from the family. This came after the American photographer Nan Goldin threatened to withdraw a planned retrospective of her work in the National Portrait Gallery if the gallery accepted a £1 million donation from a Sackler fund. In June 2019, NYU Langone Medical Center announced they will no longer be accepting donations from the Sacklers, and have since changed the name of the Sackler Institute of Graduate Biomedical Sciences to the Vilcek Institute of Graduate Biomedical Sciences. Later in 2019, the American Museum of Natural History, and the Solomon R. Guggenheim Museum and Metropolitan Museum of Art in New York, each announced they will not accept future donations from any Sacklers that were involved in Purdue Pharma.  In 2022, the British Museum announced that it would rename the Raymond and Beverly Sackler Rooms and the Raymond and Beverly Sackler Wing, as part of "development of the new masterplan", and that it "made this decision together through collaborative discussions" with the Sackler Foundation.  Prior to the collapse of his cryptocurrency, FTT, entrepreneur Sam Bankman-Fried did not have known wrong doing to launder, but is alleged to have used (among other means) “a value system of utilitarian idealism ... not orientated toward money" -- for example promising to give away 99 percent of his fortune --  which led to investors letting "down their due diligence guard.”

Collaborating with media 
Alex Shephard, writing in the New Republic, asserts that general Mark Milley - chairman of the Joint Chiefs of Staff - engaged in self-beneficial reputation laundering when he acted as a primary source for news media, providing media with inside accounts of events in the Trump White House.   Milley's intention, according to some analysts, was to prompt major media outlets to rehabilitate his reputation  (tainted by the association with the Trump administration) and in exchange, Milley provided insider information to the media.

Arwa Mahdawi, columnist for The Guardian, characterized Rudy Giuliani's appearance on The Masked Singer as reputation laundering.

Russian Oligarchs 

The United Kingdom government generated a report in 2020, analyzing the activities of Russian oligarchs in the United Kingdom.  The report states that the oligarchs had been “extending patronage and building influence across a wide sphere of the British establishment” and had employed public relations firms that were “willing beneficiaries, contributing to a ‘reputation laundering’ process”.

A notable example of Russian oligarchs participating in reputation laundering is Viatcheslav Moshe Kantor, who donated £9 million to  King Edward VII's Hospital, a facility used by the UK royal family and patronized by the queen. The donation came under scrutiny after Kantor was placed under sanctions during the 2022 invasion of Ukraine, and the hospital removed Kantor's name from a wing of the hospital.

See also 
 Ethics of philanthropy#Tainted donors
 Greenwashing
 Money laundering
 Reputation management

Footnotes

References 
  "On Mark Milley, Stephanie Grisham, reputation laundering, and complicity", Jon Allsop, 29 September 2021,  Columbia Journalism Review, https://www.cjr.org/the_media_today/milley_grisham_books_trump.php
 
 "'Reputation laundering' is lucrative business for London PR firms", Mark Sweney, 5 Sep 2017, The Guardian,  https://www.theguardian.com/media/2017/sep/05/reputation-laundering-is-lucrative-business-for-london-pr-firms?msclkid=503c1c0ad13c11ecaafef7f9a6665b7d
 
 "'It's shameful': Russian-linked billionaires have given enormous sums of money to the West's leading educational and cultural institutions", Majlie de Puy Kamp and Isabelle Chapman, 11 May 2022 CNN,  https://www.cnn.com/2022/05/11/us/russian-oligarchs-philanthropy-ukraine-war-invs/index.html

 "The Reputation-Laundering Firm That Ruined Its Own Reputation", Ed Caesar, June 25, 2018 New Yorker Magazine,   https://www.newyorker.com/magazine/2018/06/25/the-reputation-laundering-firm-that-ruined-its-own-reputation?msclkid=9e72c7e6d15911ec89233f69f8cb693a

 "How Russia’s Oligarchs Laundered Their Reputations in the West", Casey Michel, Apr. 1, 2022, New York Magazine,   https://nymag.com/intelligencer/2022/04/will-oligarchs-reputation-laundering-face-a-reckoning.html?msclkid=c8ef40b8d15911ec85f1f35c0e173fcb

 "British accountants and PR firms told to cut Russia ties", Daniel Thomas, 4 May 2022, The Financial Times,  https://www.ft.com/content/f79e55e7-dd07-4fab-b7b8-fa2991a4c4d0

 "Inquiry Into Oligarch’s Charity Which Donated to Royal Hospital", William Janes, April 23, 2022, Bloomberg News,  https://www.bloomberg.com/news/articles/2022-04-23/inquiry-into-oligarch-s-charity-which-donated-to-royal-hospital

  "Lied and need your reputation laundered? Just go on a reality TV show", Arwa Mahdawi,  5 Feb 2022, The Guardian, https://www.theguardian.com/commentisfree/2022/feb/05/rudy-giuliani-the-masked-singer-week-in-patriarchy

  "Patrick Radden Keefe on exposing the Sackler family’s links to the opioid crisis",  Sean O'Hagan,  27 Feb 2022, The Guardian,  https://www.theguardian.com/us-news/2022/feb/27/empire-of-pain-patrick-radden-keefe-sackler-opioid-crisis-oxycontin

 Empire of Pain   	Patrick Radden Keefe, April 13, 2021, Doubleday, ISBN	978-0-385-54568-6

 American Kleptocracy: How the U.S. Created the World's Greatest Money Laundering Scheme in History,  Casey Michel November 23, 2021,  ‎ St. Martin's Press ISBN‎ 1250274524

Reputation management
Public relations techniques